is a passenger railway station located in the city of Hadano, Kanagawa Prefecture, Japan.  The station operated by the private railway operator Odakyu Electric Railway.

Lines
Shibusawa Station is served by the Odakyu Odawara Line, and lies 65.6 rail kilometers from the line's terminal at Shinjuku Station.

Station layout
The station has two opposed side platforms with two tracks, with the station building is constructed on a cantilever above the platforms and tracks.

Platforms

History
Shibusawa Station was opened on 1 April 1927 on the Odakyu Odawara Line of the Odakyu Electric Railway with normal and 6-car limited express services. The current station building was completed in 1993 and the bus terminal outside the south exit was expanded in 2007.

Station numbering was introduced in January 2014 with Shibusawa being assigned station number OH40.

Passenger statistics
In fiscal 2019, the station was used by an average of 27,175 passengers daily.

The passenger figures for previous years are as shown below.

Surrounding area
Hadano Nishi Community Center

See also
List of railway stations in Japan

References

External links

 Official home page.

Railway stations in Japan opened in 1927
Odakyu Odawara Line
Railway stations in Kanagawa Prefecture
Hadano, Kanagawa